Raymond Herman Ulrich (August 28, 1898 – July 11, 1950) was an American football player for John Heisman's Georgia Tech Golden Tornado of the Georgia Institute of Technology. He played end on its 1917 team, the first team from the south to win a national championship.

References

External links

1898 births
1950 deaths
Georgia Tech Yellow Jackets football players
American football ends
Players of American football from Illinois